Marcus Antonius Creticus (flourished 1st century BC), a member of the Antonius family, was a Roman politician during the Late Roman Republic. He is best known for his failed pirate hunting career and being the father of the general Mark Antony.

Biography

Early life
Creticus was the son of Marcus Antonius (famous for his oratory). He had a sister named Antonia and a younger brother named Gaius Antonius Hybrida.

Career
He was elected praetor in 74 BC and received an extraordinary commission, similar to that bestowed upon triumvir Pompey by the Gabinian law 7 years later in 67 BC, and that conveyed on his father three decades before in 102 BC, to clear the Mediterranean Sea of the threat of piracy, and thereby assist the operations against King Mithridates VI of Pontus. Creticus not only failed in the task, but plundered the provinces he was supposed to protect from robbery. He attacked the Cretans, who had made an alliance with the pirates, but was totally defeated, most of his ships being sunk. 
Diodorus Siculus states that he only saved himself by a disgraceful treaty. 
As a result of this defeat he was mockingly given the cognomen Creticus, which means "conqueror of Crete", and also "man made of chalk", when translated from Latin. He died soon afterwards (72 BC -71 BC) in Crete. 
Most authorities are agreed as to his avarice and incompetence, but the biographer Plutarch describes him as a friendly, honest and generous man.

Family
Antonius was married to a woman named Numitoria, a daughter of Quintus Numitorius Pullus, they had no known children. Afterwards he married Julia with whom he had three sons: Marcus Antonius (the Triumvir), Gaius Antonius and Lucius Antonius, as well as a daughter named Antonia.

Notes

References

Roman Republican praetors
Senators of the Roman Republic
Ancient Roman generals
1st-century BC Romans
Creticus, Marcus
70s BC deaths
Year of birth unknown
Family of Mark Antony